SS W. P. Few was a Liberty ship built in the United States during World War II. She was named after William Preston Few, the first president of Duke University.

Construction
W.P. Few was laid down on 1 May 1944, under a Maritime Commission (MARCOM) contract, MC hull 2363, by J.A. Jones Construction, Brunswick, Georgia; she was sponsored by Mrs. J. Elmer Long, and launched on 22 June 1944.

History
She was allocated to the Isbrandtsen Steamship Co. Inc., on 3 July 1944. On 19 April 1946, she was laid up in the National Defense Reserve Fleet in Mobile, Alabama. On 18 September 1958, she was sold, along with 35 other Liberty ships, to Bethlehem Steel, for $2,666,680, for scrapping. She was removed from the fleet on 19 February 1959.

References

Bibliography

 
 
 
 
 

 

Liberty ships
Ships built in Brunswick, Georgia
1944 ships
Mobile Reserve Fleet
Beaumont Reserve Fleet